Thomas Keller (born 1955) is an American chef.

Thomas Keller is also the name of:

 Thomas Keller (card game player) (born 1980), American professional poker player
 Thomas Keller (rower) (1924–1989), president of Féderation Internationale des Sociétés d'Aviron (FISA), the governing body of international rowing
 Thomas Keller Medal, award for an outstanding international career in the sport of rowing named after Thomas Keller
 Thomas Keller (footballer) (born 1999), German footballer